David Pardo may refer to:
David Pardo (Dutch rabbi, born at Salonica) (c. 1591–1657)
David Pardo (Dutch rabbi, born in Amsterdam), 17th century rabbi and grandson of the David Pardo born at Salonica
David Pardo (Italian rabbi) (1719–1792), rabbinical commentator and liturgical poet

See also 
 Pardo (disambiguation)